Taga is the surname of the following people:
Imaye Taga (born 1985), Ethiopian-born Israeli footballer
Mosese Taga (born 1964), Fijian rugby union player
Nicolae Țaga (born 1967), Romanian rower
Saveneca Taga, Fijian rugby league player 
Tamiyo Taga, Indian politician
Taga Takatada (1425–1486), Japanese military leader

See also
Tyagi